Yana Anatolyevna Nekrasova (born February 10, 1976, in Leningrad, USSR) is a Russian curler, a , a 2003 Winter Universiade champion and a four-time Russian women's champion (1996, 1997, 1998, 2000).

She played at the 2002 Winter Olympics, where the Russian team finished in tenth place, and at the 2006 Winter Olympics, where the Russian team finished in fifth place.

Teams

Women's

Mixed

Mixed doubles

References

External links
 

Living people
1976 births
Curlers from Saint Petersburg
Curlers from Moscow
Russian female curlers
Olympic curlers of Russia
Curlers at the 2002 Winter Olympics
Curlers at the 2006 Winter Olympics
World mixed doubles curling champions
Russian curling champions
Universiade medalists in curling
Universiade gold medalists for Russia
Medalists at the 2003 Winter Universiade